This is a list of schools in the City of Bradford in the English county of West Yorkshire.

State-funded schools

Primary schools

 The Academy at St James, Allerton
 Addingham Primary School, Addingham
 All Saints CE Primary School, Little Horton
 All Saints' CE Primary School, Ilkley
 Appleton Academy, Wyke
 Ashlands Primary School, Ilkley
 Atlas Community Primary School, Manningham
 Baildon CE Primary School, Baildon
 Bankfoot Primary School, Bankfoot
 Barkerend Primary Leadership Academy, Pollard Park
 Beckfoot Allerton Primary School, Allerton
 Beckfoot Heaton Primary, Heaton
 Beckfoot Nessfield, Keighley
 Beckfoot Priestthorpe Primary School, Bingley
 Ben Rhydding Primary School, Ben Rhydding
 Blakehill Primary School, Idle
 Bowling Park Primary School, West Bowling
 Brackenhill Primary School, Great Horton
 Bradford Academy, East Bowling
 Bradford Girls' Grammar School, Girlington
 Burley and Woodhead CE Primary School, Burley in Wharfedale
 Burley Oaks Primary School, Burley in Wharfedale
 Byron Primary School, Barkerend
 Carlton Mills, Manningham
 Carrwood Primary School, Holme Wood
 Cavendish Primary School, Eccleshill
 Christ Church CE Academy, Shipley
 Clayton St John CE Primary School, Clayton
 Clayton Village Primary School, Clayton
 Co-op Academy Parkland, Thorpe Edge
 Co-op Academy Princeville, Lister Hills
 Copthorne Primary School, Shearbridge
 Cottingley Village Primary School, Cottingley
 Crossflatts Primary School, Crossflatts
 Crossley Hall Primary School, Crossley Hall
 Cullingworth Village Primary School, Cullingworth
 Denholme Primary School, Denholme
 Dixons Allerton Academy, Allerton
 Dixons Manningham Academy, Manningham
 Dixons Marchbank Primary, Barkerend
 Dixons Music Primary, Shearbridge
 East Morton CE Primary School, East Morton
 Eastburn Junior and Infant School, Eastburn
 Eastwood Community School, Keighley
 Eldwick Primary School, Gilstead
 Fagley Primary School, Fagley
 Farfield Primary School, Buttershaw
 Farnham Primary School, Lidget Green
 Fearnville Primary School, Laisterdyke
 Feversham Primary Academy, Barkerend
 Foxhill Primary School, Queensbury
 Frizinghall Primary School, Frizinghall
 Girlington Primary School, Girlington
 Glenaire Primary School, Baildon
 Green Lane Primary School, Manningham
 Greengates Primary Academy, Greengates
 Grove House Primary School, Bolton Outlanes
 Harden Primary School, Harden
 Haworth Primary School, Haworth
 Heaton St Barnabas CE Primary School, Heaton
 High Crags Primary Leadership Academy, Shipley
 Hill Top CE Primary School, Low Moor
 Hollingwood Primary School, Horton Bank
 Holybrook Primary School, Greengates
 Holycroft Primary School, Keighley
 Home Farm Primary School, Buttershaw
 Horton Grange Primary School, Great Horton
 Horton Park Primary School, Canterbury
 Hoyle Court Primary School, Baildon
 Idle CE Primary School, Idle
 Ingrow Primary School, Ingrow
 Iqra Academy, Manningham
 Keelham Primary School, Keelham
 Keighley St Andrew's CE Primary School, Keighley
 Killinghall Primary School, Barkerend
 Knowleswood Primary School, Dudley Hill
 Lapage Primary School, Barkerend
 Laycock Primary School, Laycock
 Lees Primary School, Keighley
 Ley Top Primary School, Allerton
 Lidget Green Primary School, Lidget Green
 Lilycroft Primary School, Manningham
 Long Lee Primary School, Long Lee
 Low Ash Primary School, Wrose
 Low Moor CE Primary School, Low Moor
 Lower Fields Primary Academy, Cutler Heights
 Margaret McMillan Primary School, Heaton
 Marshfield Primary, Little Horton
 Menston Primary School, Menston
 Merlin Top Primary Academy, Keighley
 Miriam Lord Primary School, Manningham
 Myrtle Park Primary, Bingley
 Newby Primary School, Holme Top
 Newhall Park Primary School, Bierley
 Oakworth Primary School, Oakworth
 Oldfield Primary School, Oldfield
 Our Lady and St Brendan's RC Primary School, Idle
 Our Lady of Victories RC School, Keighley
 Oxenhope CE Primary School, Oxenhope
 Parkwood Primary School, Keighley
 Peel Park Primary School, Undercliffe
 Poplars Farm Primary School, Bolton Outlanes
 Princeville Primary School, Lister Hills
 Rainbow Primary Leadership Academy, Shearbridge
 Reevy Hill Primary School, Buttershaw
 Riddlesden St Mary's CE Primary School, Riddlesden
 Russell Hall Primary School, Queensbury
 Ryecroft Primary Academy, Holme Wood
 The Sacred Heart RC Primary School, Ben Rhydding
 St Anne's RC Primary School, Keighley
 St Anthony's RC Primary School, Clayton
 St Anthony's RC Primary School, Shipley
 St Clare's RC Primary School, Fagley
 St Columba's RC Primary School, Dudley Hill
 St Cuthbert and the First Martyrs' RC Primary School, Heaton
 St Francis RC Primary School, Bolton Outlanes
 St John the Evangelist RC Primary School, Slack Side
 St John's CE Primary School, Bierley
 St Joseph's RC Primary School, Bingley
 St Joseph's RC Primary School, Holme Top
 St Joseph's RC Primary School, Ingrow
 St Luke's CE Primary School, Eccleshill
 St Mary's & St Peter's RC Primary School, Laisterdyke
 St Matthew's CE Primary School, West Bowling
 St Matthew's RC Primary School, Allerton
 St Oswald's CE Primary Academy, Great Horton
 St Paul's CE Primary School, Buttershaw
 St Philip's CE Primary School, Girlington
 St Stephen's CE Primary School, West Bowling
 St Walburga's RC Primary School, Shipley
 St William's RC Primary School, Longlands
 St Winefride's RC Primary School, Wibsey
 Saltaire Primary School, Saltaire
 Sandal Primary School, Baildon
 Sandy Lane Primary School, Allerton
 Shibden Head Primary Academy, Queensbury
 Shipley CE Primary School, Shipley
 Shirley Manor Primary School, Wyke
 Silsden Primary School, Silsden
 Southmere Primary Academy, Great Horton
 Stanbury Village School, Stanbury
 Steeton Primary School, Steeton
 Stocks Lane Primary School, Queensbury
 Swain House Primary School, Bolton Outlanes
 Thackley Primary School, Thackley
 Thornbury Primary Leadership Academy, Thornbury
 Thornton Primary School, Thornton
 Thorpe Primary, Idle
 Trinity All Saints CE Primary School, Bingley
 Victoria Primary School, Keighley
 Wellington Primary School, Undercliffe
 Westbourne Primary School, Manningham
 Westminster CE Primary Academy, Belle Vue
 Whetley Academy, Girlington
 Wibsey Primary School, Wibsey
 Wilsden Primary School, Wilsden
 Woodlands CE Primary Academy, Oakenshaw
 Woodside Academy, Moor Side
 Worth Valley Primary School, Keighley
 Worthinghead Primary School, Wyke
 Wycliffe CE Primary School, Shipley

Secondary schools 

 Appleton Academy, Wyke
 Beckfoot Oakbank, Keighley
 Beckfoot School, Bingley
 Beckfoot Thornton, Thornton
 Beckfoot Upper Heaton, Heaton
 Belle Vue Girls' Academy, Heaton
 Bingley Grammar School, Bingley
 Bradford Academy, East Bowling
 Bradford Forster Academy, Cutler Heights
 Bradford Girls' Grammar School, Girlington
 Bronte Girls' Academy, East Bowling
 Buttershaw Business and Enterprise College, Buttershaw
 Carlton Bolling College, Undercliffe
 Carlton Keighley, Utley
 Co-op Academy Grange, Little Horton
 Dixons Allerton Academy, Allerton
 Dixons City Academy, Holme Top
 Dixons Cottingley Academy, Cottingley 
 Dixons Kings Academy, Lidget Green
 Dixons McMillan Academy, Shearbridge
 Dixons Trinity Academy, Shearbridge
 Eden Boys' Leadership Academy, Brown Royd
 Feversham Girls' Academy, Undercliffe
 Hanson Academy, Bolton Outlanes
 The Holy Family Catholic School, Keighley
 Ilkley Grammar School, Ilkley 
 Immanuel College, Idle
 Laisterdyke Leadership Academy, Laisterdyke
 Oasis Academy Lister Park, Frizinghall
 One In A Million Free School, Belle Vue
 Parkside School, Cullingworth
 St Bede's and St Joseph's Catholic College, Heaton
 Titus Salt School, Baildon
 Tong Leadership Academy, Tong
 Trinity Academy Bradford, Queensbury

Special and alternative schools

 Beckfoot Phoenix, Keighley
 Beechcliffe School, Utley
 Bradford Alternative Provision Academy, Saltaire
 Chellow Heights School, Heaton
 Co-op Academy Delius, Barkerend
 Co-op Academy Southfield, Little Horton
 Hazelbeck School, Bingley
 High Park School, Heaton
 Oastlers School, East Bowling
 Primary Pupil Referral Unit, West Bowling
 Tracks, Shipley

Further education
 Bradford College
 Dixons Free Sixth Form
 New College Bradford
 Shipley College

Independent schools

Primary and preparatory schools
 Crystal Gardens Primary School, Holme Top
 Ghyll Royd School, Burley in Wharfedale
 Islamic Tarbiyah Preparatory School, Manningham
 Lady Lane Park School, Bingley
 Moorfield School, Ilkley
 Westville House School, Ilkley

Senior and all-through schools

 Al Mumin Schools, Manningham
 Bradford Christian School, Bolton Woods
 Bradford Grammar School, Frizinghall
 Darul Uloom Dawatul Imaan, Dudley Hill
 Eden Springs Girls Secondary, Holme Top
 Eternal Light School, Little Horton
 The Fountain School, Little Horton
 Jaamiatul Imaam Muhammad Zakaria, Clayton

Special and alternative schools
 Broadbeck Learning Centre, Buttershaw
 JAMES, Frizinghall
 Prism Independent School, Girlington
 Training and Skills Centre, Eastbrook

Bradford
Schools in the City of Bradford
Schools
Schools